The Train for Venice (French: Le train pour Venise) is a 1937 comedy play by Georges Berr and Louis Verneuil. A farce, it premiered at the Théâtre Saint-Georges in Paris with a cast that included Verneuil, Huguette Duflos, André Alerme and Roland Armontel.

Adaptations
The play has been adapted into films on two occasions: a 1938 French film The Train for Venice featuring a number of the original stage cast and a 1941 Hollywood remake My Life with Caroline starring Ronald Colman and Anna Lee, with the setting switched from Paris to America.

References

Bibliography
 Goble, Alan. The Complete Index to Literary Sources in Film. Walter de Gruyter, 1999.
 Gauteur, Claude. À propos de Louis Verneuil (1893-1952). Séguier, 2007.

1937 plays
French plays adapted into films
Comedy plays
Plays by Louis Verneuil